Dir El Ksiba is a town and rural commune in Béni Mellal Province, Béni Mellal-Khénifra, Morocco. At the time of the 2004 census, the commune had a total population of 19,130 people living in 3626 households.

References

Populated places in Béni Mellal Province
Rural communes of Béni Mellal-Khénifra